Amerila eugenia is a moth of the subfamily Arctiinae. It was described by Johan Christian Fabricius in 1794. It is found in China (eastern Tibet), Pakistan (Karachi), central and southern India and Sri-Lanka.

Subspecies
Amerila eugenia eugenia (China: Tibet, Pakistan: Karachi, central and southern India)
Amerila eugenia moorei (Rothschild, 1914)

References

 , 2010: Tiger-moths of Eurasia (Lepidoptera, Arctiidae) (Nyctemerini by ). Neue Entomologische Nachrichten 65: 1-106, Marktleuthen.
 , 1794: Entomologia Systematica emendata et aucta. Secundum classes, ordines, genera, species adjectis synonymis, locis, observationibus, descriptionibus III (II): 349 pp., Hafniae.
 , 1884: Descriptions of new species of Indian Lepidoptera-Heterocera. The Transactions of the Entomological Society of London 1884: 355-376, London.

Moths described in 1794
Amerilini
Moths of Asia